Kakae was king of the island of Maui. Kakae‘s name is sometimes given as Kakaeloiki. Kakae is mentioned in old chants.

Biography 
Kakae was a son of Chief Kaulahea I of Maui and his sister-wife, High Chiefess Kapohanaupuni of Hilo. His brother was Kakaalaneo. He and his brother appear to have jointly ruled over the islands of Maui and Lanai.

Reign 
The brothers’ courts were at Lahaina which at that time still preserved its ancient name of Lele. Kakae was surnamed Kaleo-iki, and was considered as deficient in mental qualities. Some traditions state that Luaia was his grandson, but most of the genealogies states Luaia was the grandson of Kakaʻalaneo.

Marriage 
His wife’s name was Kapohauola, and she was also the wife of ʻEhu, the son of Kuaiwa, on Hawaiian Pili line, and thus established the contemporaneity of these islands’ monarchs. Kapohauola was said to have been Kakae’s maternal aunt. Kakae’s only known son was Kahekili I. His brother appeared to succeed him to the dignity and title of Moʻi. After Kakaʻalaneo’s death, Kakae’s son succeeded him as Moʻi rather than Kakaʻalaneo’s own children.

References

 Abraham Fornander, An Account of the Polynesian Race: Its Origin and Migrations, Rutland, VT: Charles E. Tuttle Company, 1969. Page 83, 87
 The Stories & Genealogies of Maui. Page. Accessed 9 Oct 2004.

Royalty of Maui